Christopher Dyson (born February 24, 1978) is an American professional racing driver who competed in the American Le Mans Series for Dyson Racing from 2002 to 2013. He is currently competing in the Trans-Am Series in the TA class under the CD Racing banner where he just clinched his second consecutive TA championship (2021-2022). The son of team owner Rob Dyson, Chris is a two-time ALMS champion, having taken the LMP675 Drivers title in 2003 and earning the LMP1 Championship in 2011. He is the Vice President and Sporting Director of Dyson Racing.

Racing career

Early career
Dyson began his racing career at the age of 17, competing in the Skip Barber Formula Dodge championship at Lime Rock Park.

Dyson drove in seven Atlantic Championship races in 2004 and 2005, earning a best finish of 4th at Long Beach in 2005.

Grand-Am
Dyson made his professional racing debut in the 2001 Grand American Road Racing Championship season, driving a Riley & Scott Mk III in the final two races of the season. In 2002, he finished second in the Grand-Am SRP1 points, winning five races.

He has since made sporadic starts in the Rolex Sports Car Series and Continental Tire Sports Car Challenge.

American Le Mans Series

Having made his American Le Mans Series debut at the 2002 12 Hours of Sebring, Dyson went on to drive full-time in the series one year later, teaming with Andy Wallace in their MG-Lola EX257. Dyson took four wins and the drivers championship in the LMP 675 class.

The 2004 season saw the MG-Lola reclassified into the LMP1 category against the Audi R8s; Dyson and Wallace scored 6 podiums in 8 races together. In 2005, he finished 2nd in the LMP1 drivers' championship, scoring 6 runner-up finishes.

Dyson finished 5th in driver points in 2006, with a best finish of 2nd at Mosport. Dyson also finished 4th at Laguna Seca with James Weaver, in Weaver's final race. 2007 saw Dyson team with Guy Smith in a Porsche RS Spyder; the pair finished 4th in points.

He finished 6th in points in 2008 and 5th in 2009. In 2010, he finished 4th in LMP1 points and won one race with Guy Smith.

In 2011, despite winning only one race, Dyson and Guy Smith won the LMP1 drivers' championship. In 2012, Dyson kicked off the season with a class victory at the 12 Hours of Sebring, debuting the new Lola B12/60 Mazda with Guy Smith and Steven Kane.

24 Hours of Le Mans
Dyson's first start came in the 2004 24 Hours of Le Mans for Jan Lammers' Racing for Holland team with Lammers and Katsutomo Kaneishi, finishing 7th overall and 6th in the LMP1 class. Dyson returned to La Sarthe in the Le Mans for Ray Mallock, retiring after 19 hours.

NASCAR
In August 2019, Dyson joined DGM Racing to drive their No. 90 car in the NASCAR Xfinity Series' race at the Mid-Ohio Sports Car Course as a road course ringer. He would start 27th and finish 34th after crashing out of the race. Dyson returned to NASCAR in 2022, driving for Emerling-Gase Motorsports in the Xfinity Series event at Road America.

Motorsports career results

24 Hours of Le Mans

Complete FIA World Endurance Championship results

NASCAR
(key) (Bold – Pole position awarded by qualifying time. Italics – Pole position earned by points standings or practice time. * – Most laps led.)

Xfinity Series

 Ineligible for series points

References

External links

 Dyson Racing bio
 

1978 births
Living people
Sportspeople from Poughkeepsie, New York
Rolex Sports Car Series drivers
American Le Mans Series drivers
Atlantic Championship drivers
24 Hours of Le Mans drivers
Racing drivers from New York (state)
FIA World Endurance Championship drivers
European Le Mans Series drivers
NASCAR drivers
SCCA National Championship Runoffs participants
USAC Silver Crown Series drivers
Caterham Racing drivers
Greaves Motorsport drivers